Rauschenberg is a town in the north of Marburg-Biedenkopf district in Hesse, Germany.

Geography

Location
Rauschenberg lies at the southern edge of the Burgwald, a low mountain range, near Marburg and Kirchhain.

Neighbouring communities
Rauschenberg borders in the north on the town of Rosenthal (Waldeck-Frankenberg) as well as on the communities of Wohratal (Marburg-Biedenkopf) and Gilserberg (Schwalm-Eder-Kreis), in the east on the town of Stadtallendorf, in the south on the town of Kirchhain, in the southwest on the community of Cölbe, and in the west on the town of Wetter (all in Marburg-Biedenkopf).

Municipality divisions
Rauschenberg consists out of following villages: 
 Albshausen
 Bracht
 Ernsthausen
 Josbach
 Rauschenberg (town)
 Schwabendorf
 Wolfskaute

History

Even as far back as 1000, a castle was built in what is now Rauschenberg. After a fire about 1250, almost the whole settlement was destroyed. Shortly after Rauschenberg was founded by the Counts of Ziegenhain, it was granted town rights. When the "von Ziegenhain" family died out in 1450, the castle and the town fell to the House of Hesse. In this time, the castle was expanded and made into a hunting lodge.

During the Thirty Years' War, Rauschenberg was mostly destroyed and thoroughly plundered by Swedish troops. Ever since the castle was blown up at a Kassel colonel's behest two years before the war ended, there has been nothing left of it but a ruin.

Politics

Town council
Results of municipal election on 6 March 2016:

Coat of arms
Rauschenberg's civic coat of arms might be described thus: Party per fess; above, in sable a six-pointed star argent; below in Or. It matches the arms used by the town's old overlords, the Counts of Ziegenhain. An eight-pointed star in a modification of the Counts coat of arms.

Town partnership
  Westende, Belgium.

Culture and Sightseeing

Buildings
There has not been much left of the castle, later stately home, of Rauschenberg since it was destroyed in the Thirty Years' War. The ruins on the hill over the constituent community – also known as Rauschenberg – are open and free to all.

Economy and infrastructure

Transport
Rauschenberg is connected to the road network by Federal Highway (Bundesstraße) B 3 between Frankfurt and Kassel, and by Bundesstraße B 62. As for public transportation, there is a bus connection to Kirchhain which runs many times daily.

Personalities

People born in Rauschenberg 
 Johannes Hinderbach (1418-1486), Bishop of Trento
 Gustav Simon (1878-1962), administrative official

Personalities who have lived or worked in Rauschenberg 
 Peter Janich (1942-2016), philosopher and co-founder of Methodical Culturalism, died in Rauschenberg

In pop culture
A Finnish industrial music group, named Rauschenmaschine (German for noisemaschine) has a song on their website called Rauschenberg.

References

External links
 Town's official website
 

Marburg-Biedenkopf